Holloway-Jones-Day House, also known as the Day House, is a historic home located near Roxboro, Person County, North Carolina.  It was built about 1840, and is a two-story, Federal style frame farmhouse.  A rear ell and hip roofed front porch with Italianate style decorative elements were added in the mid-19th century. It has brick gable end chimneys, front and rear transoms, a hall-parlor plan and a fieldstone cellar.

The house was added to the National Register of Historic Places in 1988.

References

Houses on the National Register of Historic Places in North Carolina
Federal architecture in North Carolina
Italianate architecture in North Carolina
Houses completed in 1840
Houses in Person County, North Carolina
National Register of Historic Places in Person County, North Carolina
U.S. Route 501